A solder ring fitting, also known by the trademarked name Yorkshire fitting, is a pre-soldered capillary connector for joining copper pipes used in plumbing.

Operation
To obtain perfect joins, the inside of the fitting and the outside of the copper pipe are cleaned using coarse steel wool, flux paste is applied, the pipe is inserted into the fitting and heat applied from a portable propane torch until a ring of solder shows at the edges of the fitting.  To obtain a durable joint, water must not be poured on the solder joint to cool it.  Yorkshire fittings are now made with lead-free solder.

The fittings come in a great variety of configurations, such as Tee-pieces, straight couplers, elbows or bends, reducers (to join pipes of different diameters), stop-ends, and there are versions with screw threads (male or female) at one end to fit taps and galvanized iron pipes.

Valves such as stoptaps & gate valves are also available in solder ring configuration.

See also
 Sweat fitting

References

Plumbing
Soldering